The German Ornithologists' Society was founded in 1850, and is one of the world's oldest existing scientific societies. Its goal is to support and further scientific ornithology in Germany on all levels. It publishes the Journal of Ornithology, founded in 1853.

References
History of the Society

Ornithological organizations
Animal welfare organisations based in Germany
1850 establishments in Germany
Scientific societies based in Germany